Henricus Josephus van Spaandonck (25 June 1913 – 31 July 1982) was a Dutch football forward who played for the Netherlands in the 1938 FIFA World Cup. He also played for Neptunus Rotterdam.

References

External links
 
 

1913 births
1982 deaths
Dutch footballers
Netherlands international footballers
Association football forwards
1938 FIFA World Cup players
Sportspeople from Roosendaal
Footballers from North Brabant